Crvena gora (Serbian Cyrillic: Црвена гора) is a mountain in western Serbia, above the town of Ivanjica.

References

Mountains of Serbia